The 8th Seiyu Awards ceremony was held on March 1, 2014.

References

Seiyu Awards ceremonies
Seiyu
Seiyu
2014 in Japanese cinema
2014 in Japanese television